Jim Hall's Three is an album by guitarist Jim Hall recorded in 1986 and released by the Concord Jazz label.

Reception

AllMusic awarded the album 4 stars, with the review by Ken Dryden stating, "Hall, as usual, solos in his unique economical style and leaves plenty of breathing room for the music ... This is another gem from one of the deans of modern jazz guitar".

Track listing
All compositions by Jim Hall except where noted
 "Hide and Seek" – 4:06
 "Skylark" (Hoagy Carmichael, Johnny Mercer) – 7:11
 "Bottlenose Blues" – 4:35
 "And I Do" – 5:04
 "All the Things You Are" (Jerome Kern, Oscar Hammerstein II) – 4:59
 "Poor Butterfly" (Raymond Hubbell, John Golden) – 5:57
 "Three" – 8:48

Personnel
Jim Hall – guitar
Steve LaSpina – bass
Akira Tana – drums

References 

1986 albums
Jim Hall (musician) albums
Albums produced by Carl Jefferson
Concord Records albums